is a Japanese actor and musician from Odawara, Kanagawa. He is best known for his role in the 2009 Super Sentai series Samurai Sentai Shinkenger as Chiaki Tani/Shinken Green. He is the lead guitarist for the rock group Cocoa Otoko, and is represented by the Japanese agency Hirata Office.

Filmography

Television
Samurai Sentai Shinkenger as Tani Chiaki/Shinken Green (2009–2010)
Kamen Rider Decade as Chiaki Tani/Shinken Green (2009, ep-24-25)
Dosokai as Kōta (2010)
Heaven's Rock as Ryuichi (2010)
Kodai Shōjotai Dogoon V as Shōta Tsukimiya (2010)
Crystal as Katsumi Oshima (2011)

Movies
Samurai Sentai Shinkenger The Movie: The Fateful War - Chiaki Tani/Shinken Green (2009)
Samurai Sentai Shinkenger vs. Go-onger: GinmakuBang!! - Chiaki Tani/Shinken Green (2010)
Come Back! Samurai Sentai Shinkenger - Chiaki Tani/Shinken Green (2010)
Tensou Sentai Goseiger vs. Shinkenger: Epic on Ginmaku - Chiaki Tani/Shinken Green (2011)
BADBOYS - Tsukasa Kiriki (2011)
Gokaiger Goseiger Super Sentai 199 Hero Great Battle - Chiaki Tani (2011)
Gal Basara: Sengoku Jidai wa Kengai Desu - (2011)
Kamen Rider Saber + Kikai Sentai Zenkaiger: Super Hero Senki - Chiaki Tani/Shinken Green (2021)

Stage play
 Musical "Hakuoki" - Kazama Chikage
 Saito version (2012)
 Okita Souji version (2013)
 Hijikata Toshizo version (2013)
 HAKU-MYU LIVE (2014)
 Kazama Chikage version (2014)
 Todo Heisuke version (2015)
 HAKU-MYU LIVE 2 (2016))
 Stage play "Tokyo Ghoul" (2015) - Nishio Nishiki
 Stage play "Tokyo Ghoul" (2017) - Nishio Nishiki
 Musical "Moriarty the Patriot" (2019) - William James Moriarty
 Musical "Moriarty the Patriot" Op2: A Scandal In British Empire (2020) - William James Moriarty
 Musical "Moriarty the Patriot" Op3: The Phantom Of Whitechapel (2021) - William James Moriarty
 Musical "Moriarty the Patriot" Op4: The Two Criminals (2023) - William James Moriarty

References

External links
Twitter
Official Site
Official Blog
Cocoa Otoko. Official Site

1989 births
People from Odawara
Male actors from Kanagawa Prefecture
Living people
Musicians from Kanagawa Prefecture
21st-century Japanese male actors
21st-century Japanese musicians